Siyaram Sagar is an Indian politician and a member of the Sixteenth Legislative Assembly of Uttar Pradesh in India. He represents the Faridpur constituency of Uttar Pradesh and is a member of the Samajwadi Party political party.

Early life and education
Siyaram Sagar was born in Bareilly district. He attended the Calcutta Homeopathic Medical College and Hospital and attained a Bachelor's degree. He is a homeopathic doctor by profession. Sagar belongs to the scheduled caste community.

Political career
Siyaram Sagar has been a MLA for five terms. He represented the Faridpur constituency and is a member of the Samajwadi Party political party.

He lost his seat in the 2017 Uttar Pradesh Assembly election to Shyam Bihari Lal of the Bharatiya Janata Party.

Posts held

See also
 Faridpur (Assembly constituency)
 Sixteenth Legislative Assembly of Uttar Pradesh
 Uttar Pradesh Legislative Assembly

References 

Samajwadi Party politicians
Uttar Pradesh MLAs 1977–1980
Uttar Pradesh MLAs 1989–1991
Uttar Pradesh MLAs 1993–1996
Uttar Pradesh MLAs 2002–2007
Uttar Pradesh MLAs 2012–2017
People from Bareilly district
1945 births
Living people